White Sands is a summer village in Alberta, Canada. It is located on the southeast shore of Buffalo Lake, northwest from the Town of Stettler and east of the Summer Village of Rochon Sands and Rochon Sands Provincial Park.

The summer village is within the municipal boundaries of the County of Stettler No. 6.

Demographics 

In the 2016 Census of Population conducted by Statistics Canada, the Summer Village of White Sands had a population of 120 living in 59 of its 253 total private dwellings, a  change from its 2011 population of 91.

See also 
List of communities in Alberta
List of summer villages in Alberta
List of resort villages in Saskatchewan

References

External links 

1980 establishments in Alberta
Summer villages in Alberta